Being Human, originally titled Being Human Being!, is a 2010 Singaporean comedy film directed by Jack Neo.

Plot
Natural Beauty branch manager Mai Wei is fired from his job. He sets up a rival company, named the My Way Slimming Centre, with several former Natural Beauty employees, including his wife Zu Er's brother Jie. He soon licenses Dadavianxiaovoo, a herbal slimming drug which contains a banned substance.

Cast
 Mark Lee as Mai Wei
 Yeo Yann Yann as Zu Er
 Jeremy Chan as Jie
 Tay Yin Yin as Wang Yaoyao
 Wang Lei as Wang Yaoyao’s father
 NoNo as Chen Xuanyu
 Huang Hui as Natural Beauty boss
 Huang Tongyao as associate
 Zhong Jiayan as slim Wang Yaoyao
 Macy Chen as Mrs. Li
 Abigail Chay as Dadavianxiaovoo saleswoman
 Jack Neo as waiter
 Wendy Chong

Release
The film released in theatres in Singapore on 4 March 2010.

Reception
Derek Elley of Film Business Asia rated the film 7 out of 10. Kwok Kar Peng of The New Paper rated the film 3.5 stars out of 5, writing "Unlike his previous movies, Jack peppers morals sparingly here. The pacing and story are tight with an interesting ending, and the chemistry among the cast is sizzling." Katrina Brooke Lam of today wrote the film a negative review.

References

External links
 

2010 films
Singaporean comedy films